NGC 5925 is an open cluster in the constellation Norma. It is 5070 light-years distant and thought to be around 316 million years old.

References

NGC 5925
5925
Norma (constellation)